Help Yourself is a 1932 British comedy film directed by Jean Daumery and starring Benita Hume, Martin Walker and D. A. Clarke-Smith. It is based on the novel Sinners All by Jerome Kingston. It was produced at Teddington Studios in London by the British subsidiary of Warner Brothers.

Cast
 Benita Hume as Mary Lamb
 Martin Walker as George Quinnock
 D. A. Clarke-Smith as Major Fred Harris
 Kenneth Kove as Peter Ball
 Clifford Heatherley as Fox-Cardington
 Hay Petrie as Sam Short
 Helen Ferrers as Lady Hermione Quinnock
 Marie Wright as Sparrow
 Hal Gordon as Bobby Vane

References

Bibliography
 Low, Rachael. Filmmaking in 1930s Britain. George Allen & Unwin, 1985.
 Wood, Linda. British Films, 1927-1939. British Film Institute, 1986.

External links

1932 films
1932 comedy films
Films directed by Jean Daumery
British comedy films
British black-and-white films
1930s English-language films
1930s British films
Films based on British novels
Films shot at Teddington Studios
Warner Bros. films